Ing is a medieval English surname, of Norse-Viking origins, possibly from the name of the Norse god Yngvi or from someone living near an ing, a meadow. It can also be a romanisation of the East Asian surname Ng.

Notable people with this surname
Chloe Ing (born 1998), Singaporean figure skater
David Ing (born 1958), Canadian engineer and systems scientist
Dean Ing (1931–2020), American thriller and science fiction author
Joe Ing (1890–1977), English footballer
Nita Ing (born 1955), Taiwanese executive and the former Chairman of the Board of the Taiwan High Speed Rail Corporation
Peter Ing (born 1969), former NHL goaltender
Roger Ing (1933–2008), Chinese Canadian artist

References